The Hour of the Knife is a crime novel by American author Sharon Zukowski, published in 1992 by St. Martin's Press. The story follows a Manhattan private detective, Blaine Stewart, as she attempts to unravel a mystery while on vacation. The novel is the first in a series of five to feature the Blaine Stewart character.

Summary
Blaine Stewart, a private detective from Manhattan, visits the Carolina coast for a vacation. While there, she receives a call from a former friend who is killed shortly afterwards. Stewart must solve the crime, along with uncovering drug trafficking and other crimes in the coastal retreat.

Reception
The novel received mixed reviews. Publishers Weekly praised the novel's pacing and characters. Kirkus Reviews described the book as a "cliche-riddled debut", featuring "comic-book villains and ineffective attempts at hard-boiled dialogue."

References

1991 American novels
Crime novels